Sir Charles Meredyth (died November 1700) was an Anglo-Irish politician who was Chancellor of the Exchequer of Ireland.

He was the son of Sir Robert Meredyth and Anne Ussher.

Meredyth sat in the Irish House of Commons as the Member of Parliament for Old Leighlin from 1661 to 1666. He was knighted in Ireland on 4 Sep 1664 and made a member of the Privy Council of Ireland in August 1671. In 1674 he was appointed Chancellor of the Exchequer, serving in the role until 1687 when he was replaced by the Roman Catholic Bruno Talbot by James II. He was reinstated to the position by William III in 1690. He represented the Gowran constituency from 1692 to 1693. He surrendered the office of Chancellor in 1695 and died in England five years later.

References

Year of birth unknown
1700 deaths
17th-century Anglo-Irish people
Chancellors of the Exchequer of Ireland
Irish MPs 1661–1666
Irish MPs 1692–1693
Knights Bachelor
Members of the Parliament of Ireland (pre-1801) for County Carlow constituencies
Members of the Parliament of Ireland (pre-1801) for County Kilkenny constituencies
Members of the Privy Council of Ireland
Charles